SV Ried is an Austrian association football club from Ried im Innkreis, Upper Austria. The team plays its home matches at Josko Arena, a stadium with a capacity of 7,680. After being relegated from Bundesliga in the 2016–17 season, SV Ried have returned to the top tier 2020-21 Austrian Football Bundesliga after being crowned champions of 2019-20 Austrian Football Second League. For sponsorship reasons, the name of the club is currently SV Guntamatic Ried.

History

The club formed on 5 May 1912 as Sportvereinigung Ried, and played in the regional leagues of Upper Austria until 1991, when they ascended to the national leagues for the first time. SV Ried first achieved promotion to the highest level of Austrian football in 1995.

SV Ried gained their first major honour in 1998 when they won the Austrian Cup, beating Sturm Graz 3–1 in the final. In 2003, Ried were relegated, ending an eight-year spell in the top division. Two seasons later, Ried regained Bundesliga status, becoming champions of the Erste Liga on 23 May 2005 following a 3–2 victory over Kapfenberg. In the following season (2005–06) Ried achieved their highest league finish so far, fourth, in the Bundesliga. The year after they managed to improve once more finishing second and becoming vice-champion. After the first third of the season, the team seemed to battle against relegation and was stuck in the last place for five game weeks. The club management however kept trusting in Helmut Kraft's coaching abilities, which would turn out to be the right decision after all. Twelve matches without a loss in the second third of the season and five wins out of the last five matches from match weeks 32–36 guaranteed the club's highest league finish of second place and a spot in the first qualifying round of the UEFA Cup.

Honours
Austrian Cup
Winners: 1997–98, 2010–11

Austrian First League
Winners: 2004–05, 2019–20

Players

Current squad

Out on loan

Retired numbers
27 –  Sanel Kuljić, striker (2003–06)

Club Officials

Manager history

  Klaus Roitinger (1 July 1988 – 31 May 1999)
  Heinz Hochhauser (1 July 1999 – 31 May 2000)
  Helmut Kronjäger (1 July 2000 – 20 April 2001)
  Alfred Tatar (21 April 2001 – 21 March 2002)
  Gerhard Schweitzer (26 March 2002 – 13 May 2003)
  Klaus Roitinger (interim) (14 May 2003 – 31 May 2003)
  Petar Segrt (1 July 2003 – 31 Dec 2003)
  Andrzej Lesiak (1 Jan 2004 – 30 June 2004)
  Heinz Hochhauser (1 July 2004 – 31 May 2006)
  Helmut Kraft (1 June 2006 – 22 Oct 2007)
  Thomas Weissenböck (22 Oct 2007 – 6 April 2008)
  Michael Angerschmid (interim) (9 April 2008 – 30 June 2008)
  Georg Zellhofer (8 May 2008 – 2 July 2008)
  Gerhard Schweitzer (interim) (2 July 2008 – 11 July 2008)
  Paul Gludovatz (11 July 2008 – 19 March 2012)
  Gerhard Schweitzer (interim) (20 March 2012 – 31 May 2012)
  Heinz Fuchsbichler (1 June 2012 – 6 Nov 2012)
  Gerhard Schweitzer (interim) (6 Nov 2012 – 9 Dec 2012)
  Michael Angerschmid (9 Dec 2012 – 31 May 2014)
  Oliver Glasner (1 June 2014 – 31 May 2015)
  Helgi Kolviðsson (1 June 2015 – 16 August 2015)
  Paul Gludovatz (16 August 2015 – 30 June 2016)
  Christian Benbennek (1 July 2016 –28 February 2017)
  Lassaad Chabbi (1 March 2017 –2 April 2018)
  Franz Schiemer (2 April 2018 –18 April 2018)
  Thomas Weissenböck (18 April 2018 –12 November 2018)
   Miron Muslic (12 November 2018 –25 November 2018)
  Gerald Baumgartner (1 January 2019 –15 December 2020)
  Gerhard Schweitzer (15 December 2020 –31 December 2020)
    Miron Muslic (1 January 2021 –25 March 2021)
  Christian Heinle (8 November 2021 –31 December 2021)
  Robert Ibertsberger (1 January 2022 –18 April 2022)
  Christian Heinle (19 April 2022 –)

European Cup history
Q = Qualifying
PO  = Play-Off

External links
 
 SV Ried at UEFA.COM
 SV Ried at EUFO.DE
 SV Ried at Weltfussball.de
 SV Ried at Football Squads.co.uk
 SV Ried at National Football teams.com
 SV Ried at Football-Lineups.com

 
Association football clubs established in 1912
Football clubs in Austria
1912 establishments in Austria